The Last Champion is a 2020 American sports drama film directed by Glenn Withrow and starring Cole Hauser.

Cast
Cole Hauser as John Wright
Sean H. Scully as Michael Miller
Hallie Todd as Melinda Miller
Randall Batinkoff as Bobby Baker
Peter Onorati as Frank Stevens
Annika Marks as Elizabeth Barnes
Bob McCracken as Pastor Barnes
Taylor Dearden as Joanna Miller
Casey Moss as Scott Baker

Production
Hauser's casting was announced in December 2016.

The film was shot in Idaho and Washington.  Filming occurred in Garfield, Washington.  Filming also occurred in the Allen Event Center in Allen, Texas.

Release
The film was released on digital platforms on December 8, 2020.

Reception
Michael Foust of Crosswalk.com gave the film both the entertainment rating and family friendly rating a 4 out of 5.

References

External links
 
 

2020 films
2020 drama films
2020s sports drama films
American sports drama films
2020s English-language films
2020s American films